Binaltorphimine (BNI) is a selective antagonist of the κ-opioid receptor (KOR). BNI and norbinaltorphimine (nor-BNI) were the first highly selective KOR antagonists to be discovered.

See also
 5'-GNTI
 JDTic

References

4,5-Epoxymorphinans
Phenols
Tertiary alcohols
Kappa-opioid receptor antagonists